Jacklin is the surname of the following people:
Harley M. Jacklin (1889–1970), American farmer, businessman, and politician
Harold Jacklin (1897–1966), English football goalkeeper 
John Jacklin (born 1947), English cricketer
Julia Jacklin (born 1990), Australian singer-songwriter 
Paula Jacklin (born 1957), English darts player 
Tony Jacklin (born 1944), English golfer

English-language surnames